Daqiao is a town of Renhua County in northern Guangdong province, China, located  from downtown Shaoguan in the southern part of the county, bordering Qujiang and Zhenjiang Districts to the south. The town is served by China National Highway 106. , it has one residential community and 6 villages under its administration.

See also 
 List of township-level divisions of Guangdong

References 

Towns in Guangdong
Renhua County